AUC may refer to:

 African Union Commission, the executive/administrative branch or secretariat of the supranational organisation
 Ammonium uranyl carbonate, a chemical compound used in uranium processing
 Appropriate use criteria for a medical procedure or service
 Area under the curve (receiver operating characteristic), a performance measure for binary classifiers
 Area under the curve (pharmacokinetics), regarding plasma drug concentration-time curves
 Authentication Center in a GSM mobile phone network
 United Self-Defense Forces of Colombia, former Colombian paramilitary and drugs group
 Santiago Pérez Quiroz Airport, Arauca, Colombia, IATA code
 Analytical ultracentrifugation, Physical and biophysical chemistry instrument
 a codon for the amino acid isoleucine

Colleges and universities
 Aalborg University, formerly Aalborg University Center
 Alliance University College, merged into Ambrose University College, Calgary, Alberta, Canada
 Amsterdam University College, a liberal arts and sciences college in Amsterdam, Netherlands
 The American University in Cairo, Egypt
 American University of the Caribbean a medical school in Sint Maarten 
 Apple University Consortium in Australia
 Atlanta University Center, the University Center Consortium in Atlanta, Georgia
 Atlantic Union College, a liberal arts college in South Lancaster, Massachusetts, US

Religious
 American Unitarian Conference, religious organization